Ypsolophidae is a family of moths with some 160 species. They are included in the Plutellidae by many authors.

Systematics
This is a list of genera and selected species.

Ypsolophinae
 Phrealcia Chrétien, 1900
 Ypsolopha Latreille, 1796

Ochsenheimeriinae
 Ochsenheimeria Hübner, 1825

The following genera are not assigned to a subfamily:
Alapa
Bhadorcosma
Bhadorcosma lonicerae Moriuti, 1977
Euceratia
Euceratia castella Walsingham, 1881
Euceratia securella Walsingham, 1881
Rhabdocosma
Rhabdocosma aglaophanes Meyrick, 1935
Rhabdocosma dolini Gershenson, 2001

References

Ypsolopha at funet. Retrieved on Oct 13 2007.
Plutellidae collection of the Siberian Zoological Museum
Ypsolophidae at Japanese Moths

 
Moth families